Events during the year 1963 in Northern Ireland.

Incumbents
 Governor - 	The Lord Wakehurst 
 Prime Minister - Basil Brooke (until 25 March), Terence O'Neill (from 25 March)

Events
17 January – Prototype Short SC.7 Skyvan short-haul freighter first flies.
25 March – Terence O'Neill succeeds Viscount Brookeborough as Prime Minister of Northern Ireland.
23 September – British Enkalon synthetic fibre factory opens in Antrim.
2 October – Second Short SC.1 VTOL research aircraft (XG905), flying from Belfast Harbour Airport, crashes due to a control malfunction, killing the pilot, J. R. Green.
28 October – Belfast Aldergrove opened as the principal airport for Northern Ireland, civilian facilities transferring from Nutts Corner.

Arts and literature

Sport

Football
Irish League
Winners: Distillery

Irish Cup
Winners: Linfield 2 – 1 Distillery

Golf
British Ladies Amateur Golf Championship is held at Royal County Down Golf Club, (winner: Brigitte Varangot).

Births
10 July – Conor Murphy, Sinn Féin MP and MLA.
30 July – Thomas Buchanan, Democratic Unionist Party MLA.
9 August – Sam Storey, boxer.
25 August – Candida Doyle, keyboard player.
12 October – Alan McDonald, footballer and football manager.
27 October – Johnny Adair, loyalist paramilitary.
11 December
Tom Elliott, Ulster Unionist Party MLA.
David Hilditch – Democratic Unionist Party MLA.
15 December – Christopher "Crip" McWilliams, Chief of Staff of the Irish National Liberation Army.
Richard English, historian.
Siobhán O'Hanlon, Sinn Féin official (died 2006).

Deaths
22 November – C. S. Lewis, novelist and author of The Chronicles of Narnia (born 1898).
30 November – Dehra Parker, longest serving woman MP in Northern Ireland and first woman to serve in the Northern Ireland Cabinet.
December – Andy Kennedy, footballer (born 1897).

See also
1963 in Scotland
1963 in Wales

References

 
Northern Ireland